Assemblée Nationale may refer to:
 National Assembly of France (the current lower house of the French Parliament)
 National Constituent Assembly (the French legislature from 1789 to 1791)
 Legislative Assembly (France) (the French legislature from 1791 to 1792)
 National Assembly of Quebec
 National Assembly of Cameroon
 National Assembly of Senegal
 Parliament of Lebanon
 Assemblée Nationale (Paris Métro), a station on the Paris Métro system

See also
 National Assembly